Emrys Ellis  (29 June 1904 — 24 June 1981) was a Welsh international footballer.

Career
Ellis was a school master by profession. He joined non-league Nunhead in 1927, winning the Isthmian League in the 1928–29 and 1929–1930 seasons. He was part of the Wales national football team between 1930 and 1931, playing 3 matches. He played his first match on 25 October 1930 against Scotland and his last match on 5 December 1931 against Ireland. During his career, Ellis also played for Oswestry Town.

Honours
Nunhead

Isthmian League: 1928–29, 1929–30

See also
 List of Wales international footballers (alphabetical)

References

1904 births
1981 deaths
People from Ruabon
Sportspeople from Wrexham County Borough
Welsh footballers
Wales international footballers
Oswestry Town F.C. players
Association football midfielders